The following is a list of bishops of the Catholic Church in the Philippines. 

The Catholic Church in the Philippines comprises:

 72 Latin Church dioceses led by bishops
 7 Apostolic Vicariates led by Apostolic Vicars
 The Military Ordinariate of the Philippines , for military personnel

Organization
The Catholic Church in the Philippines is organized into 72 dioceses in 16 ecclesiastical provinces, as well as 7 apostolic vicariates and a military ordinariate. Each province has a metropolitan archdiocese led by an archbishop, and at least one suffragan diocese. In most archdioceses and some large dioceses, one or more auxiliary bishops serve in association with the diocesan bishop.

All active and retired bishops in the Philippines, coadjutor, and auxiliary — are members of the Catholic Bishops Conference of the Philippines (CBCP).

Cardinals
, one Latin Church metropolitan archbishops in the Philippines is a cardinal: 

 Manila (Jose F. Cardinal Advincula)

Two Philippine archdioceses have retired archbishops who served as cardinal-archbishop of their archdiocese: 

 Manila (Gaudencio B. Cardinal Rosales)
 Cotabato (Orlando B. Cardinal Quevedo)

One Filipino cardinal who was formerly a metropolitan archbishop is assigned at the Roman Curia:
Luis Antonio G. Cardinal Tagle

List of current bishops

Living bishops-emeriti

Filipino bishops serving outside of the Philippines

Bishop serving in the Roman Curia

Bishops in the Vatican Diplomatic Corps

Bishops serving in foreign sees

Papal Nuncio to the Philippines

See also 
 Catholic Church in the Philippines
 Historical list of the Catholic bishops of the Philippines
 List of Roman Catholic archdioceses
 List of Roman Catholic dioceses
 List of Catholic dioceses in the Philippines

References

Catholic Hierarchy
G Catholic
Catholic Bishop's Conference of the Philippines

 
Philippines
bishops